Seelabathi is a 2005 Malayalam drama film written and directed by R. Sarath, starring Kavya Madhavan and Narain in the lead roles. The film, according to the director, is for "all those girls who have been reported missing from several parts of the State."

The film opened on 12 December to critical acclaim.

Plot
The movie begins with the arrival of Seelabathi and her mother Sumangala to Kerala from Bengal. Though Sumangala returns to Bengal, Seelabathi stays behind because she gets a temporary job as a computer teacher in a school, for a few months. She stays with her grandparents. Her grandfather is a farmer who loves farming more than perhaps anything else. And in school, she soon gets adapted to things and becomes friendly with her students. Sheelabathi also meets a young doctor Jeevan, with whom she becomes very friendly. In the village there are people who come to dig huge bore-wells and consequently there is much of water scarcity. And young students disappear mysteriously from the school and end up being sexually exploited. Their parents accuse that it is due to the new teacher's computer courses that such incidents were happening in the village. Then the story continues telling how Sheelabathi overcomes to all problems.

Cast
 Kavya Madhavan as Seelabathi
 Narain as Dr. Jeevan Bhasker
 Urmila Unni as Sumangala
 Nedumbram Gopi
 Indrans as Vasu/Basu
 C. K. Babu as farmer

References

External links
 Seelabathi at the British Film Institute Movie Database
 Seelabathi at the Malayalam Movie Database

2000s Malayalam-language films
Films directed by R. Sarath